Mount Grendal is a peak rising to  between the heads of Valhalla Glacier and Conrow Glacier in the Asgard Range of Victoria Land, Antarctica. It was mapped by the United States Geological Survey in 1962 from U.S. Navy aerial photographs taken 1947–59, and was named by the New Zealand Antarctic Place-Names Committee in 1983 from association with Mount Beowulf after Grendal (Grendel), the monster in the Old English epic poem Beowulf.

References

Mountains of the Asgard Range
McMurdo Dry Valleys